The 1974 Pro Bowl was the NFL's 24th annual all-star game which featured the outstanding performers from the 1973 season. The game was played on Sunday, January 20, 1974, at Arrowhead Stadium in Kansas City, Missouri. The final score was AFC 15, NFC 13. The attendance for the game was 51,484 though nearly 70,000 tickets were sold.

John Madden of the Oakland Raiders coached the AFC while the NFC was led by the Dallas Cowboys' Tom Landry.

Kicker Garo Yepremian of the Miami Dolphins was the game's MVP. Yepremian set a Pro Bowl record which still stands as of 2018, kicking five field goals in the game. This was the last American football game to have the goal posts on the goal line, before being moved back to the endline the next year to make field goals harder for teams to make.  The referee for the game was Jack Reader, who retired from on-field work after the Pro Bowl to accept a position as the NFL's Assistant Supervisor of Officials.

Players on the winning AFC team each received $2,000 while the NFC participants took home $1,500.

AFC roster

Offense

Defense

Special teams

NFC roster

Offense

Defense

Special teams

References

External links

Pro Bowl
Pro Bowl
Pro Bowl
Pro Bowl
American football in Missouri
Sports in the Kansas City metropolitan area
January 1974 sports events in the United States